Time of Our Lives or The Time of Our Lives may refer to:

Music
Time of Our Lives (Marcia Hines album), 1999
The Time of Our Lives (EP), an extended play by Miley Cyrus, 2009
"The Time of Our Lives", title track from the EP
"Time of Our Lives" (Bonnie Raitt song), 2002
"The Time of Our Lives", one of two songs on the double A-side single "Time of Our Lives/Connected" by Paul van Dyk, 2003
"The Time of Our Lives" (Il Divo and Toni Braxton song), 2006
"Time of Our Lives", 2010 song by Tyrone Wells from the album Metal & Wood
"Time of Our Lives", 2011 song by Night Ranger from the album Somewhere in California
"Time of Our Lives", 2013 song by British boy band ReConnected
"Time of Our Lives" (Chawki song), 2014
"Time of Our Lives" (Pitbull and Ne-Yo song), 2014
"Time of Our Lives", 2017 song by James Blunt
"Time of Our Lives", 2017 EDM single by Manse featuring Jantine

Other
Time of Our Lives (TV series), a 2009 television series hosted by Jeff Stelling for Sky Sports
The Time of Our Lives: A Conversation About America, a 2011 book by Tom Brokaw
The Time of Our Lives (TV series), a 2013-2014 Australian television drama series

See also
 Times of Our Lives (disambiguation)
 Time of Your Life (disambiguation)
 Time of My Life (disambiguation)